is a Japanese race walker.

Yamazaki began to participate in race walking at high school, and competed at the World Junior championships in his junior year.

At the Osaka World Championships in 2007, he was in contention in the 50 km race until he was misdirected by officials and disqualified for entering the stadium without completing the full course.  If he had finished in the top eight, he would have qualified for the 2008 Summer Olympics.  He managed to qualify for the 2008 Olympics after setting a new Japanese record at the Japanese national championships.

International competitions

References

 

1984 births
Living people
Sportspeople from Toyama Prefecture
Japanese male racewalkers
Olympic male racewalkers
Olympic athletes of Japan
Athletes (track and field) at the 2004 Summer Olympics
Athletes (track and field) at the 2008 Summer Olympics
Athletes (track and field) at the 2012 Summer Olympics
Asian Games competitors for Japan
Athletes (track and field) at the 2002 Asian Games
Athletes (track and field) at the 2006 Asian Games
Athletes (track and field) at the 2014 Asian Games
World Athletics Championships athletes for Japan
Japan Championships in Athletics winners
20th-century Japanese people
21st-century Japanese people